5α-Pregnane-3α,17α-diol-20-one, also known as 17α-hydroxyallopregnanolone (17-OH-allo) is an endogenous steroid.

Function
5α-Pregnane-3α,17α-diol-20-one is an intermediate product within the androgen backdoor pathway in which 17α-hydroxyprogesterone (17‐OHP) is 5α-reduced and finally converted to 5α-dihydrotestosterone (DHT) without testosterone as a metabolic intermediate.
 
The pathway can be outlined as 17-OHP → 5α-pregnan-17α-ol-3,20-dione → 5α-pregnane-3α,17α-diol-20-one → androsterone → 5α-androstane-3α,17β-diol → DHT.

Biosynthesis
5α-Pregnane-3α,17α-diol-20-one is produced from 5α-pregnan-17α-ol-3,20-dione in a reaction catalyzed by a reductive 3α-hydroxysteroid dehydrogenase (3α-HSD), i.e. by the two aldo-keto reductase isozymes: AKR1C2 and AKR1C4, and by 17β-hydroxysteroid dehydrogenase 6 (HSD17B6) that also has the 3α-HSD activity.

See also
 Androgen backdoor pathway
 Pregnane
 5α-Pregnane
 Allopregnane
 Allopregnanolone
 5α-Pregnan-17α-ol-3,20-dione
 5α-Dihydrotestosterone

References

Pregnanes
5α-Pregnanes